Sion Segre Amar (Turin, May 19, 1910– ibidem, September 4, 2003) was an Italian Jewish writer who survived the holocaust when he fled to Mandatory Palestine in 1939.

He studied at the Liceo classico Massimo d'Azeglio and later natural sciences at the university. In 1934, he and other young men from Turin were stopped at the Swiss Italian border for having anti-fascist leaflets in their possession. During the fascist period, he was a member of the political party Giustizia e Libertà and in the 1960s he was the president of the Jewish Community in Turin. He was an avid collector and compiled one of the most important private collections of medieval manuscripts called the Comites Latentes . Several of his books he used to carry with him during his journeys. In the 1960s he began to buy manuscrips at Sotheby's in London, until his collection reached about 300 volumes. The collection was deposited for several years in the library of the University of Geneva. In

Works
Amico mio e non della ventura, 1990
Il logogrifo,1990
Il mio ghetto, 1996

References

1910 births
2003 deaths
20th-century Italian writers
20th-century Italian Jews
Writers from Turin
Italian emigrants to Mandatory Palestine